In the United States Government, the Bureau of East Asian and Pacific Affairs (EAP, originally the Office of Chinese Affairs) is part of the United States Department of State and is charged with advising the Secretary of State and Under Secretary of State for Political Affairs on matters of the Asia-Pacific region, as well as dealing with U.S. foreign policy and U.S. relations with countries in that area.  It is headed by the Assistant Secretary of State for East Asian and Pacific Affairs, who reports to the Under Secretary of State for Political Affairs.

Organization
The offices of the Bureau of East Asian and Pacific Affairs direct, coordinate, and supervise U.S. government activities within the region, including political, economic, consular, public diplomacy, and administrative management issues.

Office of Australia, New Zealand, and Pacific Island Affairs (EAP/ANP) – Coordinates policy on Australia, Fiji, Kiribati, the Marshall Islands, Micronesia, Nauru, New Zealand, Palau, Papua New Guinea, Samoa, the Solomon Islands, Tonga, Tuvalu, Vanuatu and Antarctica
Office of Chinese and Mongolian Affairs (EAP/CM) – Coordinates policy regarding China and Mongolia
Office of Regional and Security Policy (EAP/RSP)
Office of Public Affairs (EAP/P) – Coordinates the bureau's media engagement and domestic public outreach, and prepares press guidance for the Department Spokesperson in the Bureau of Public Affairs
Office of Japanese Affairs (EAP/J) – Oversees Japan–United States relations
Office of Mainland Southeast Asian Affairs (EAP/MLS) – Coordinates policy on Burma, Cambodia, Laos, Thailand, and Vietnam
Office of Maritime Southeast Asian Affairs (EAP/MTS) – Coordinates policy on Brunei,  East Timor, Indonesia, Malaysia, the Philippines and Singapore.
Office of Korean Affairs (EAP/K) – Coordinates policy towards North Korea and South Korea
Office of Public Diplomacy (EAP/PD)
Office of Multilateral Affairs (EAP/MLA) – Coordinates policy regarding the Association of Southeast Asian Nations (ASEAN), the East Asia Summit, the ASEAN Regional Forum, the Lower Mekong initiative and the Council for Security Cooperation in the Asia Pacific
Office of Taiwan Coordination (EAP/TC) – Oversees Taiwan–United States relations
Office of Economic Policy (EAP/EP)
Office of the Executive Director (EAP/EX) – Oversees the bureau's human resources and resource management

References

External links

EAP
United States diplomacy
United States–Asian relations
United States–Oceanian relations
United States and the Antarctic
Australia–United States relations
Brunei–United States relations
Cambodia–United States relations
China–United States relations
East Timor–United States relations
Fiji–United States relations
Indonesia–United States relations
Japan–United States relations
Kiribati–United States relations
Laos–United States relations
Malaysia–United States relations
Marshall Islands–United States relations
Federated States of Micronesia–United States relations
Mongolia–United States relations
Myanmar–United States relations
Nauru–United States relations
New Zealand–United States relations
North Korea–United States relations
Palau–United States relations
Papua New Guinea–United States relations
Philippines–United States relations
Samoa–United States relations
Singapore–United States relations
Solomon Islands–United States relations
South Korea–United States relations
Taiwan–United States relations
Thailand–United States relations
Tonga–United States relations
Tuvalu–United States relations
United States–Vanuatu relations
United States–Vietnam relations